Chester-le-Street Amateur Rowing Club is a rowing club on the River Wear, based at the Riverside Sports Complex, Chester-le-Street, County Durham.

History
The club was founded in 1888 initially rowing from a boathouse in a park that burnt down during the 1930s. After a dormant period the club was started again by Bob Heywood during the 1980s.

In recent years the club has produced several national champions.

The British Rowing board took the decision to suspend the affiliation of the club with British Rowing effective from 2 August 2022.

Club colours
The blade colours are red, royal blue and a white diagonal stripe; kit: red & royal blue.

Notable members
Victoria Bryant

Honours

National champions

References

Sport in County Durham
Rowing clubs in England
Chester-le-Street
Rowing clubs of the River Wear